Anton Pius Riegel or Rigel (1789 - ?) was an Austrian architect of the 19th century.

He is mainly known for the design of the Károlyi palais in Budapest Hungary (now housing the Petőfi Museum of Literature - Petőfi Irodalmi Múzeum) and of the mansion of Dolná Krupá in Slovakia.

References

Sources
 Museum of Literature 
 Jana Šulcová - Tri kapitoly zo stavebných dejín kaštieľa v Dolnej Krupej – Ars No.1-3, 1996
 Szabadidõ
 A Károlyi-palota,  

1789 births
Year of death unknown
19th-century Austrian people
Austro-Hungarian people
19th-century Austrian architects
Austrian expatriates in Hungary
Architecture in Slovakia